Mohsin Issa CBE and Zuber Issa CBE are British-Indian billionaire brothers and businessmen, best known for founding Euro Garages (later renamed EG Group) in 2001, a Blackburn-based chain of petrol filling stations and convenience stores that operate in Europe, the United States and Australia. In 2020, as part of a consortium with TDR Capital, the brothers became majority stakeholders in the British supermarket chain, Asda. EG's annual sales across 10 countries are currently valued at €20 billion.

Early lives
Mohsin and Zuber Issa were born in July 1971 and June 1972 respectively in Blackburn, Lancashire in North West England into an Indian Gujarati Muslim family to parents Vali and Zubeda who came to the United Kingdom from Bharuch, Gujarat, India in the 1960s to work in the textile industry and then ran a petrol pump. They were educated at Witton Park High School. Their childhood was a modest one, growing up in a terraced house in Blackburn.

Careers

After leaving school, the brothers worked in the rag trade for a short time, Zuber went on to run a news kiosk in Blackburn called Euro News. In 1993, Mohsin co-founded plastic-bag firm Europlast alongside older brother Zakir, of which Zuber would become a shareholder in 1998.

Before founding Euro Garages, the Issa brothers took out a lease on a garage, and saved up the money to buy their first petrol station. They co-founded Euro Garages in 2001, with the acquisition of a single petrol station in Bury, Greater Manchester.

Euro Garages' expanded as oil majors (such as Esso) offloaded their forecourt sites, with Euro Garages using these acquisitions to expand retail and food convenience offerings. 

Mohsin Issa runs the business day to day while brother Zuber Issa is responsible for strategy and acquisitions. The company grew through a series of acquisitions. In February 2018, it was announced that Euro Garages would acquire 762 convenience stores in the United States from Kroger.

In October 2020, Walmart announced an agreement to sell a majority stake in Asda to a consortium of the Issa brothers and private equity firm TDR Capital.

In April 2021 it was announced that the Issa brothers purchased British fast food chain Leon via EG Group, comprising more than 70 restaurants across the UK, in an acquisition reportedly worth up to £100 million.

Other interests 
Through their Monte Group company the Issa brothers are investors in the sports brand Castore.

In 2021, the brothers lost out to ASOS in hoping to acquire the fashion retailer Topshop. In 2022, the brothers attempted to acquire pharmacy chain Boots, however its American owners Walgreens decided to retain it and took it off the market. Later in the year, the brothers attempted to acquire McColl's, but lost out to Morrisons. Attempts to acquire Caffè Nero have also fallen through.

Personal lives 
The Issa brothers are both British-Indians, British-Gujaratis and British-Muslims.

Mohsin Issa is married to Shamin, and they have a son and a daughter, both of whom work for Euro Garages. He still lives in Blackburn and, alongside his brother, is building five mansions for themselves and their relatives, ten minutes' drive from where they grew up. He along with his brother invested in a £25 million mansion in Knightsbridge, in Central London.

Controversy 
Zuber Issa and his brother Mohsin Issa have come under criticism for their tax affairs, along with having "appalling" safety standards at a company they co-owned. Criticisms include a lack of transparency compared to other companies of the same size.

Accolades
Mohsin Issa and Zuber Issa were each appointed Commander of the Order of the British Empire (CBE) in the 2020 Birthday Honours for services to business and charity.

References 

1971 births
1972 births
Living people
British people of Indian descent
British people of Gujarati descent
British Muslims
English people of Indian descent
English people of Gujarati descent
English Muslims
British businesspeople of Indian descent
21st-century British businesspeople
English billionaires
Conservative Party (UK) donors
People from Blackburn
Commanders of the Order of the British Empire